A survival store, outdoors store, preparedness store, or wilderness store is a retail outlet where survival or preparedness equipment can be purchased. Typically survival stores stock camping and backpacking equipment, long-term storage food, fishing equipment, and occasionally bicycles.

Goods
Typical goods include:
Tents
Sleeping bags
 Storage food (usually dehydrated or freeze dried) with long shelf life
Electrical generators
First aid supplies
MREs (meals ready to eat)
Wind-up radios
Wind-up flashlights

Retailers by type of merchandise sold
Survivalism